Sant'Anastasia is a comune (municipality) in the Metropolitan City of Naples in the Italian region Campania, located about  northeast of Naples.

Sant'Anastasia borders the following municipalities: Casalnuovo di Napoli, Ercolano, Pollena Trocchia, Pomigliano d'Arco, Somma Vesuviana. It is located in the Vesuvius National Park, at the feet of the Monte Somma (the Vesuvius' most ancient crater).

Twin towns - Sister cities

Sant'Anastasia is twinned with:
 Bethlehem, Palestine

References

Cities and towns in Campania
Mount Vesuvius